Calimesa (portmanteau of California and Mesa, Spanish for "table") is a city in Riverside County, California, United States in the Greater Los Angeles area. The population was 7,879 at the 2010 census, up from 7,139 at the 2000 census. It is situated in the San Gorgonio Pass.

History

Etymology

Historically, Calimesa began as a small rural town with mostly single-family homes and ranches.  With completion of U.S. Route 99 (modern day I-10), businesses opened and Calimesa began to take on a separate identity from the larger neighboring town of Yucaipa. In June 1929, nearly 100 residents attended a meeting and decided to apply for their own post office and to start a “name contest” in which the winner was paid $10. Calimesa was chosen from 107 names submitted, and is said to come from “cali” (referring to California) and “mesa” from the Spanish word meaning "table" or "table-lands."  The first post office was the grocery store at Calimesa Boulevard and Avenue K.

Beginnings
The modern history of the area was initiated with the establishment of Spanish missions in Alta California in 1769. The need for a land route to these missions inspired Captain Juan Bautista de Anza to lead a party through the area in 1774. As early as 1820, reference can be found to the messenger footpath for the missions in Arizona to the San Gabriel Mission.

The Assistencia in Redlands (which has been rebuilt), and Rancho San Gorgonio, were part of the San Gabriel Mission located near today's Los Angeles. The San Gorgonio rancheria covered most of the San Gorgonio Pass area. A site within the rancheria, the location of the present Highland Springs Ranch & Inn, along with Whitewater, and a house at the east end of present-day Singleton Road in Calimesa, all became stage stops along this path.

The post office reinforced the residents' feeling of a community separate from the town of Yucaipa. In 1939 or 1940, the Calimesa Improvement Association, Inc. was formed. According to the constitution of the association, “The object and purpose of the association shall be the development and improvement of Calimesa and The Community”. Volunteers built a community center at the corner of Bryant and Avenue H, which had been designated a park site by the Redlands-Yucaipa Land Company. The "South Mesa Water Company" purchased the land for a well site and allowed the association to use it for community events.

In 1962, the Calimesa Improvement Association became the Calimesa Chamber of Commerce. The Improvement Association and the Chamber have operated as a mix of promoting Calimesa, providing community service, and being a sounding board for residents’ problems. Prior to 1949, the fire protection for the valley was provided by the California Department of Forestry at the Avenue A station, which today is the office of County Service Area 63 in Yucaipa. Calimesa community members felt the need for more protection on the south side of the wash, so in 1949 they formed the Volunteer Fire Department.

Incorporation
The City of Calimesa was incorporated on December 1, 1990, soon after the incorporation of its northern neighbor, the City of Yucaipa.  Prior to its incorporation, the City of Calimesa existed as an unincorporated census designated town that straddled the Riverside–San Bernardino County line at the location where Interstate 10 climbs the San Gorgonio Pass going eastward from Redlands, California.

Future
The previous decade saw several planned communities approved for development within the city, including the JP Ranch Development (approximately 750 total homes), Calimesa Springs Development (approximately 270 homes), Summerwind Ranch at Oak Valley (3,841 homes, 260 acres of mixed-use commercial), and Mesa Verde (3,500 homes, and 64 acres of mixed-use commercial space). The number of approved units currently outnumbers the total population within the city. However, development of these large tracts have been slow to move forward until the demand increases.

Sandalwood Fire

The Sandalwood Fire, which started October 10, 2019, burned for five days.

Transportation
The city is accessible from Interstate 10, which geographically traverses the city from north to south. Major transportation corridors include County Line Road (which runs east–west from the freeway), Sandalwood Drive (which runs east–west from the freeway), Singleton Road (which runs east–west from the freeway), Cherry Valley Boulevard (which runs east–west from the freeway), Avenue "L" (which runs east–west from the freeway), Myrtlewood Drive (which runs east–west from Calimesa Boulevard to California Street), Calimesa Boulevard (which runs north–south and parallels the freeway from Live Oak Canyon Road in Yucaipa to Cherry Valley Boulevard/Tukwet Canyon Parkway near Beaumont), and Bryant Street (which runs north–south from Highway 38/Mill Creek Road/Mentone Boulevard and connects with Singleton Road). The city has no airports or direct access to railroads.

Geography
The city is located in the northwestern portion of Riverside County, between Yucaipa and Beaumont. It is within the Yucaipa Valley section of Southern California's Inland Valley, and at the western edge of the San Gorgonio Pass between San Bernardino and Palm Springs. Calimesa is located in the region known as the Inland Empire, which covers San Bernardino and Riverside Counties.

City limits
Historically, Calimesa is divided from the City of Yucaipa by the Wildwood Canyon Wash; politically, "County Line Road" divides the two towns. Much of what was originally known as "Calimesa" actually lies within the city boundaries of Yucaipa, including "I-Street" (Calimesa) Park and Calimesa Elementary School. Because State of California law prohibits the incorporation or annexation of cities over county lines, the city was unable to adjoin what was considered the town of Calimesa when it finally incorporated. When Yucaipa incorporated, it included the area outside of the Yucaipa Valley on the "hilltop" or "mesa" that was traditionally known as Calimesa within its city boundaries, so as not to leave a gap of unincorporated area between the two towns. Although the two cities are in separate counties, both Yucaipa and Calimesa share the same basic street grid system and addressing, including many named and alphabetical streets which extend from Yucaipa well into Calimesa. The general boundary between the two cities is County Line Road, which does not follow the exact county line in some places due to the alignment of Calimesa Creek, which meanders in and out of both Yucaipa and Calimesa.

The city limits of Calimesa also extend south to the City of Beaumont, California. Although much less refined, the boundaries between Beaumont and Calimesa fall generally along the Southern California Edison (SCE) right-of-way that extends from the El Casco electrical sub-station facility near Moreno Valley, California, eastward. Near Interstate 10, Champions Drive is the common boundary between the two cities.

Demographics

2010
At the 2010 census Calimesa had a population of 7,879. The racial makeup of Calimesa was 6,777 (86.0%) White (72.7% Non-Hispanic White), 88 (1.1%) African American, 99 (1.3%) Native American, 100 (1.3%) Asian, 10 (0.1%) Pacific Islander, 565 (7.2%) from other races, and 240 (3.0%) from two or more races. Hispanic or Latino of any race were 1,762 persons (22.4%).

The census reported that 7,828 people (99.4% of the population) lived in households, 42 (0.5%) lived in non-institutionalized group quarters, and 9 (0.1%) were institutionalized.

There were 3,314 households, 773 (23.3%) had children under the age of 18 living in them, 1,609 (48.6%) were opposite-sex married couples living together, 334 (10.1%) had a female householder with no husband present, 157 (4.7%) had a male householder with no wife present. There were 162 (4.9%) unmarried opposite-sex partnerships, and 22 (0.7%) same-sex married couples or partnerships. 1,024 households (30.9%) were one person and 609 (18.4%) had someone living alone who was 65 or older. The average household size was 2.36.  There were 2,100 families (63.4% of households); the average family size was 2.94.

The age distribution was 1,414 people (17.9%) under the age of 18, 602 people (7.6%) aged 18 to 24, 1,513 people (19.2%) aged 25 to 44, 2,310 people (29.3%) aged 45 to 64, and 2,040 people (25.9%) who were 65 or older.  The median age was 48.8 years. For every 100 females, there were 92.4 males.  For every 100 females age 18 and over, there were 89.8 males.

There were 3,687 housing units at an average density of 248.3 per square mile, of the occupied units 2,674 (80.7%) were owner-occupied and 640 (19.3%) were rented. The homeowner vacancy rate was 5.9%; the rental vacancy rate was 10.3%.  6,059 people (76.9% of the population) lived in owner-occupied housing units and 1,769 people (22.5%) lived in rental housing units.

According to the 2010 United States Census, Calimesa had a median household income of $44,817, with 14.5% of the population living below the federal poverty line.

2000
At the 2000 census there were 7,139 people in 2,982 households, including 2,006 families, in the city. The racial make-up of the city was 89.1% White, 0.6% Black or African American, 0.7% Native American, 1.1% Asian, 0.1% Pacific Islander, 5.4% from other races, and 3.1% from two or more races. 14.1% of the population were Hispanic or Latino of any race.
Of the 2,982 households 24.2% had children under the age of 18 living with them, 54.3% were married couples living together, 9.2% had a female householder with no husband present, and 32.7% were non-families. 28.1% of households were one person and 16.8% were one person aged 65 or older. The average household size was 2.36 and the average family size was 2.87.

The age distribution was 21.8% under the age of 18, 6.2% from 18 to 24, 23.0% from 25 to 44, 23.0% from 45 to 64, and 26.0% 65 or older. The median age was 44 years. For every 100 females, there were 88.6 males.  For every 100 females age 18 and over, there were 84.8 males.

The median income for a household in the city was $37,849 in 2000, and $43,557 in 2007. The median family income  in 2000 was $43,220. Males had a median income of $41,533 versus $27,232 for females. The per capita income for the city was $20,242. About 8.4% of families and 12.2% of the population were below the poverty line, including 18.2% of those under age 18 and 9.6% of those age 65 or over.

Government

Calimesa is one of a few cities in California to elect a Libertarian mayor, by the name of Jeff Hewitt.

2009 Voter Registration Information

Total Registered Voters = 4,301
Democrats - 1,373 or 32%
Republican - 2,121 or 49%
Other - 180 or 4%
Decline to State - 627 or 15%

Voting History

Education
Public education for most Calimesa children is provided by the Yucaipa-Calimesa Joint Unified School District, with the remaining southernmost area now served by the neighboring Beaumont Unified School District. Few of the existing "developed" portions of the city are currently within the Beaumont boundaries, but the area within the Beaumont Unified School District boundaries is the fastest growing area of town.

Schools
The City of Calimesa is within two school districts; the Yucaipa-Calimesa Joint Unified School District serves the western portion of the city, while the southeastern end of the city is served by the Beaumont Unified School District. There is currently only one public school in Calimesa, Mesa View Middle School, which opened in late August 2009. Mesa View was built to be the school district's second high school. However, due to a slowdown in home construction, the district is facing declining enrollment. As a result, Mesa View will remain a middle school until growth requires a change. In November 2017, a 13-year-old student at Mesa View Middle School who was frequently bullied committed suicide, increasing global awareness about bullying and suicide among young adults.

Calimesa Elementary School is actually located within the City of Yucaipa, and high school students attend Yucaipa High School. Calimesa's only currently-operating elementary school—and only currently operating high school—is Mesa Grande Academy, a private K-12 school owned by the Seventh-day Adventist Church.

The nearest community college is Crafton Hills College in Yucaipa.

Public safety
Police services in Calimesa are provided by the Riverside County Sheriff's Department via the Cabazon regional station.

The city of Calimesa is served by the Calimesa Fire Department.

Although there are several clinics in Calimesa, the nearest medical facilities are in Yucaipa, Redlands, Banning and Beaumont.

References

External links

 
Cities in Riverside County, California
Incorporated cities and towns in California
Yucaipa, California
Populated places established in 1990
1990 establishments in California